Umar ibn Abd al-Aziz (2 November 680 – ), commonly known as Umar II, was the eighth Umayyad caliph.

He was also a cousin of the former caliph, being the son of Abd al-Malik's younger brother, Abd al-Aziz. He was also a matrilineal great-grandson of the second caliph, Umar ibn Al-Khattab. 

Surrounded with great scholars, he is credited with having ordered the first official collection of Hadiths and encouraged education to everyone.
He also sent out emissaries to China and Tibet, inviting their rulers to accept Islam. At the same time, he remained tolerant with non-Muslim citizens. According to Nazeer Ahmed, it was during the time of Umar ibn Abd al-Aziz that the Islamic faith took roots and was accepted by huge segments of the population of Persia and Egypt.
 
Militarily, Umar is sometimes deemed a pacifist, since he ordered the withdrawal of the Muslim army in places such as Constantinople, Central Asia and Septimania despite being a good military leader. However, under his rule the Umayyads conquered many territories from the Christian kingdoms in the Iberian Peninsula.

Early life
Umar was likely born in Medina around 680. His father, Abd al-Aziz ibn Marwan, belonged to the wealthy Umayyad clan resident in the city, while his mother, Umm Asim bint Asim, was a granddaughter of Caliph Umar ibn al-Khattab. His descent from Caliph Umar would later be much emphasized by Umar II and the traditional Muslim sources to differentiate him from the other Umayyad rulers. At the time of his birth, another branch of the Umayyads, the Sufyanids, ruled the Caliphate from Damascus. When Caliph Yazid I and his son and successor, Mu'awiya II, died in quick succession in 683 and 684, respectively, Umayyad authority collapsed across the Caliphate and the Umayyads of the Hejaz, including Medina, were expelled by supporters of the rival caliph, the Mecca-based Abd Allah ibn al-Zubayr. The Umayyad exiles took refuge in Syria, where loyalist Arab tribes supported the dynasty. Umar's grandfather, Marwan I, was ultimately recognized by these tribes as caliph and, with their support, reasserted Umayyad rule in Syria. 

In 685, Marwan ousted Ibn al-Zubayr's governor from Egypt and appointed Umar's father to the province. Umar spent part of his childhood in Egypt, particularly in Hulwan, which had become the seat of his father's governorship between 686 and his death in 705. He received his education in Medina, however, which was retaken by the Umayyads under Umar's paternal uncle, Caliph Abd al-Malik, in 692. Having spent much of his youth in Medina, Umar developed ties with the city's pious men and transmitters of hadiths. Following the death of Umar's father, Abd al-Malik recalled Umar to Damascus, where he arranged Umar's marriage to his daughter, Fatima. Umar had two other wives: his maternal cousin Umm Shu'ayb or Umm Uthman, the daughter of Shu'ayb or Sa'id ibn Zabban of the Banu Kalb tribe, and Lamis bint Ali of the Balharith. From his wives he had seven known children, as well as seven other children from concubines.

Governor of Medina
Shortly after his accession, Abd al-Malik's son and successor, al-Walid I, appointed Umar governor of Medina. According to Julius Wellhausen, al-Walid's intention was to use Umar to reconcile the townspeople of Medina to Umayyad rule and " the evil memory" of the preceding Umayyad governors, namely Hisham ibn Isma'il al-Makhzumi, whose rule over Medina had been harsh for its inhabitants. Umar took up the post in February/March 706 and his jurisdiction later extended to Mecca and Ta'if. 

Information about his governorship is scant, but most traditional accounts note that he was a "just governor", according to historian Paul Cobb. He often led the annual Hajj pilgrimage in Mecca and showed favor toward the Islamic legal scholars of Medina, notably Sa'id ibn al-Musayyab. Umar tolerated many of these scholars' open criticism of the Umayyad government's conduct. However, other accounts hold that he showed himself to be materialistic during his early career. On al-Walid's orders, Umar undertook the reconstruction and expansion of the Prophet's Mosque in Medina beginning in 707. Under Umar's generally lenient rule, the Hejaz became a refuge for Iraqi political and religious exiles fleeing the persecutions of al-Hajjaj ibn Yusuf, al-Walid's powerful viceroy over the eastern half of the Caliphate. According to Cobb, this served as Umar's "undoing" as al-Hajjaj pressured the caliph to dismiss Umar in May/June 712.

Courtier of al-Walid and Sulayman
Despite his dismissal, Umar remained in al-Walid's favor, being the brother of the caliph's first wife, Umm al-Banin bint Abd al-Aziz. He remained in al-Walid's court in Damascus until the caliph's death in 715, and according to the 9th-century historian al-Ya'qubi, he performed the funeral prayers for al-Walid. The latter's brother and successor, Sulayman, held Umar in high regard. Alongside Raja ibn Haywa al-Kindi, an influential religious figure in the Umayyads' court, Umar served as a principal adviser of Sulayman. He accompanied the latter when he led the Hajj pilgrimage to Mecca in 716 and on his return to Jerusalem. Likewise, he was at the caliph's side at the Muslims' marshaling camp at Dabiq in northern Syria, where Sulayman directed the massive war effort to conquer the Byzantine capital of Constantinople in 717.

Caliphate

Accession
According to the traditional Muslim sources, when Sulayman was on his deathbed in Dabiq, he was persuaded by Raja to designate Umar as his successor. Sulayman's son Ayyub had been his initial nominee, but predeceased him, while his other sons were either too young or away fighting on the Byzantine front. The nomination of Umar voided the wishes of Abd al-Malik, who sought to restrict the office to his direct descendants. The elevation of Umar, a member of a cadet branch of the dynasty, in preference to the numerous descendants of Abd al-Malik surprised these princes. According to Wellhausen, "nobody dreamed of this, himself [Umar] least of all". Raja managed the affair, calling the Umayyad princes into Dabiq's mosque and demanding that they recognize Sulayman's will, which Raja had kept secret. Only after the Umayyads accepted did Raja reveal that Umar was the caliph's nominee. Hisham ibn Abd al-Malik voiced his opposition, but relented after being threatened with violence. A potential intra-dynastic conflict was averted with the designation of a son of Abd al-Malik, Yazid II, as Umar's successor. 

According to the historian Reinhard Eisener, Raja's role in the affair was likely "exaggerated"; "more reasonable" was that Umar's succession was the result of "traditional patterns, like seniority and well-founded claims" stemming from Caliph Marwan I's original designation of Umar's father, Abd al-Aziz, as Abd al-Malik's successor, which had not materialized due to Abd al-Aziz predeceasing Abd al-Malik. Umar acceded without significant opposition on 22 September 717.

Reforms

The most significant reform of Umar II was effecting the equality of Arabs and mawali (non-Arab Muslims). This was mainly relevant to the non-Arab troops in the Muslim army, who had not been entitled to the same shares in spoils, lands and salaries given to Arab soldiers. The policy also applied to Muslim society at large. Under previous Umayyad rulers, Arab Muslims had certain financial privileges over non-Arab Muslims. Non-Arab converts to Islam were still expected to pay the jizya (poll tax) that they paid before becoming Muslims. Umar put into practice a new system that exempted all Muslims, regardless of their heritage, from the jizya tax. He also added some safeguards to the system to make sure that mass conversion to Islam would not cause the collapse of the finances of the Umayyad government. Under the new tax policy, converted mawali would not pay the jizya (or any other dhimmi tax), but upon conversion, their land would become the property of their villages and would thus remain liable to the full rate of the kharaj (land tax). This compensated for the loss of income due to the diminished jizya tax base.
He issued an edict on taxation stating: 
Whosoever accepts Islam, whether Christian, Jew or Zoroastrian, of those now subject to taxes and who joins himself to the body of the Muslims in their abode, forsaking the abode in which he was before, he shall have the same rights and duties as they have, and they are obliged to associate with him and to treat him as one of themselves.

Possibly to stave off potential blowback from opponents of the equalization measures, Umar expanded the Islamization drive that had been steadily strengthening under his Marwanid predecessors. The drive included measures to distinguish Muslims from non-Muslims and the inauguration of an Islamic iconoclasm. He put a stop to the ritual cursing of Caliph Ali, the cousin and son-in-law of Muhammad, in Friday prayer sermons. The ritual had begun under Ali's opponent and future founder of the Umayyad Caliphate Mu'awiya I during the First Muslim Civil War.

Umar II is credited with having ordered the first official collection of hadith (sayings and actions attributed to the Islamic prophet Muhammad), fearing that some of it might be lost. Abu Bakr ibn Muhammad ibn Amr ibn Hazm and Ibn Shihab al-Zuhri are among those who compiled hadiths at Umar II's behest.

Provincial administrations
Shortly after his accession, Umar overhauled the administrations of the provinces. He appointed competent men that he could control, indicating his intention "to keep a close eye on provincial administration". Wellhausen noted that the caliph did not leave the governors to their own devices in return for their forwarding of the provincial revenues; rather, he actively oversaw his governors' administrations and his main interest was "not so much the increase of power as the establishment of right".

He subdivided the vast governorship established over Iraq and the eastern Caliphate under Abd al-Malik's viceroy al-Hajjaj ibn Yusuf. Sulayman's appointee to this super-province, Yazid ibn al-Muhallab, was dismissed and imprisoned by Umar for failing to forward the spoils from his earlier conquest of Tabaristan along the southern Caspian coast to the caliphal treasury. In place of Ibn al-Muhallab, he appointed Abd al-Hamid ibn Abd al-Rahman ibn Zayd ibn al-Khattab, a member of Caliph Umar I's family, to Kufa, Adi ibn Artah al-Fazari to Basra, al-Jarrah ibn Abdallah al-Hakami to Khurasan and Amr ibn Muslim al-Bahili, a brother of the conqueror Qutayba ibn Muslim, to Sind. He appointed Umar ibn Hubayra al-Fazari to the Jazira (Upper Mesopotamia). Although many of these appointees were pupils of al-Hajjaj or affiliated with the Qays faction, Umar chose them based on their reliability and integrity, rather than opposition to Sulayman's government.

Umar appointed al-Samh ibn Malik al-Khawlani to al-Andalus (Iberian Peninsula) and Isma'il ibn Abd Allah to Ifriqiya. He chose these governors because of their perceived neutrality in the tribal factionalism between the Qays and Yaman and justice toward the oppressed.

Military policy

After his accession in late 717, Umar ordered the withdrawal of the Muslim army led by his cousin Maslama ibn Abd al-Malik from their abortive siege against Constantinople to the regions of Antioch and Malatya, closer to the Syrian frontier. He commissioned an expedition in the summer of 718 to facilitate their withdrawal. Umar kept up the annual summer raids against the Byzantine frontier, out of the obligation to jihad. He remained in northern Syria, often residing at his estate in Khunasira, where he built a fortified headquarters. 

At some point in 717, he dispatched a force under Ibn Hatim ibn al-Nu'man al-Bahili to Adharbayjan to disperse a group of Turks who had launched damaging raids against the province. In 718, he successively deployed Iraqi and Syrian troops to suppress the Kharijite rebellion of Shawdhab al-Yashkuri in Iraq, though some sources say the revolt was settled diplomatically.

Umar is often deemed a pacifist by the sources and Cobb attributes the caliph's war-weariness to concerns over the diminishing funds of the caliphal treasury. Wellhausen asserts that Umar was "disinclined to wars of conquest, well-knowing that they were waged, not for God, but for the sake of spoil". Blankinship considers this reasoning to be "insufficient". He proposed it was the massive losses faced by the Arabs in their abortive siege against Constantinople, including the destruction of their navy, that caused Umar to view his positions in al-Andalus, separated by the rest of the Caliphate by sea, and Cilicia as acutely vulnerable to Byzantine attack. Thus he favored withdrawing Muslim forces from these two regions. This same calculus led to him to consider withdrawing Muslim forces from Transoxiana so as to shore up the defenses of Syria. Shaban views Umar's efforts to curb offensives as linked to the resentment of the Yamani elements of the army, who Shaban views to have been politically dominant under Umar, at excessive deployments in the field.
  
Although he halted further eastward expansion, the establishment of Islam in a number of cities in Transoxiana, precluded Umar's withdrawal of Arab troops from there. During his reign, the Muslim forces in al-Andalus conquered and fortified the Mediterranean coastal city of Narbonne in modern-day France.

Efforts in inviting people to Islam (Dawah)
Following the example of the Prophet, Umar sent out emissaries to China and Tibet, inviting their rulers to accept Islam. According to Nazeer Ahmed, it was during the time of Umar ibn Abd al-Aziz that Islam took roots and was accepted by a large segment of the population of Persia and Egypt. When the officials complained that because of conversions, the jizya revenues of the state had experienced a steep decline, Umar wrote back saying that he had accepted the Caliphate to invite people to Islam and not to become a tax collector. The infusion of non-Arabs in large number into the fold of Islam shifted the center of gravity of the empire from Medina and Damascus to Persia and Egypt.

Death
On his way back from Damascus to Aleppo or possibly to his Khunasira estate, Umar fell ill. He died between 5 February and 10 February 720, at the age of 37, in the village of Dayr Sim'an (also called Dayr al-Naqira) near Ma'arrat al-Nu'man. Umar had purchased a plot there with his own funds and was buried in the village, where the ruins of his tomb, built at an unknown date, are still visible. Umar II was succeeded by Yazid II.

On 26 May 2020, during the Syrian Civil War, Iran-backed militias reportedly raided Umar's mausoleum as shown in video footage published by pro-Syrian government pages on social media. Another video showed the grave opened and emptied. No information was available about where the remains buried inside were moved.

Assessment and legacy 
The unanimous view in the Muslim traditional sources is that Umar was pious and ruled like a true Muslim in singular opposition to the other Umayyad caliphs, who were generally considered "godless usurpers, tyrants and playboys". The tradition recognized Umar as an authentic caliph, while the other Umayyads were viewed as kings. In the view of Hawting, this is partly based on the historical facts and Umar's character and actions. He holds that Umar "truly as all evidence indicates was a man of honour, dignity and a ruler worthy of every respect". As a result of this and his short term in office, it is difficult to assess the achievements of his caliphate and his motives. Indeed, Kennedy calls Umar "the most puzzling character among the Marwanid rulers". As Kennedy states "He was a pious individual who attempted to solve the problems of his day in a way which would reconcile the needs of his dynasty and state with the demands of Islam". In the assessment of H. A. R. Gibb, Umar acted to prevent the collapse of the caliphate by "maintaining the unity of the Arabs; removing the grievances of the mawālī; and reconciling political life with the claims of religion."

Views
, stated:

The third Islamic century famous scholar and poet Al-Taymi said:

In his al-Futūḥāt al-Makkiyya, Ibn Arabi claimed that Mu'awiya II was a spiritual Pole (Ghawth) of his time and one of the few in history having such a spiritual degree combined with a temporal power, like the Rashidun caliphs and caliph Umar ibn Abd al-Aziz.

Ancestry

See also 

 Mujaddid

References

Bibliography

 

Tillier, Mathieu. (2014). Califes, émirs et cadis : le droit califal et l’articulation de l’autorité judiciaire à l’époque umayyade, Bulletin d’Études Orientales, 63 (2014), p. 147–190.

682 births
720 deaths
Arab Muslims
Year of birth uncertain 
8th-century Umayyad caliphs
Mujaddid
8th-century rulers in Asia
8th-century rulers in Africa
8th-century rulers in Europe
Umayyad governors of Medina
One Thousand and One Nights characters